We Will Overcome may refer to:

 We Will Overcome (song), a song by Thursday, from the album A City by the Light Divided
 We Will Overcome (album), a 2010 album by Close Your Eyes

See also
 "We Shall Overcome", a protest song